Tyrell Biggs (born December 22, 1960) is an American former professional boxer who competed from 1984 to 1998, and challenged once for the undisputed heavyweight title in 1987. As an amateur he won a gold medal at the 1984 Summer Olympics, having previously won bronze at the 1983 Pan American Games and gold at the 1982 World Championships, all in the super heavyweight division.

Early life
Biggs was born in Philadelphia, Pennsylvania, making his sporting debut playing basketball at West Philadelphia High. He was a starting forward for the Speedboys' Public League and City champions in 1978, a team that extended a state-record winning streak to 68 before a regular season loss to Overbrook. In '77, one of Biggs' teammates was Gene Banks, who went on to excel at Duke and play  in the NBA. After his initial boxing successes, he changed his name to "Tyrell."

Amateur career

Biggs' first major success as an amateur boxer was winning the gold medal at the 1981 United States National Boxing Championships in the super-heavyweight division. He repeated this feat the next year, and also in 1982 he won the World Championships in Munich, West Germany, where in the final he defeated Francesco Damiani from Italy on points, who beat the legendary Teofilo Stevenson earlier in the competition. In 1983 Biggs won a bronze medal on the Pan American Games, losing to future professional challenger Jorge Luis Gonzalez in the semi-final. In addition, Biggs won a 3–2 split decision over Cuban Angel Milian, who had beaten Greg Page five years earlier.

In 1984 Biggs won the gold medal at the Summer Olympics in Los Angeles, California, defeating future Olympic gold medallist and professional world champion Lennox Lewis in the quarter-finals. In the Olympics final Biggs beat Damiani on points again.

Biggs finished his amateur career with an outstanding record of 108-6-4.

Professional career
He turned professional soon after his Olympic victory, scoring a 6-round unanimous decision over Mike Evans on November 15, 1984 at Madison Square Garden in New York City in his first bout. Besides Mike Tyson, Lewis and Damiani he went on to face such other boxing luminaries as James "Quick" Tillis, Ossie Ocasio, Riddick Bowe, Tony Tubbs, Buster Mathis, Jr., and Larry Donald before ending his career with a second-round knockout of Carlton Davis in 1998. He did not win a title, but stalked the rankings of contendership for much of the mid- to late 1980s.

Biggs vs. Tyson

Biggs' biggest professional fight was against Tyson, for the latter's undisputed heavyweight title. Biggs and Tyson disliked each other, and Biggs derided Tyson before the fight. Biggs attempted to outbox Tyson, using his jab and movement. But Tyson kept coming in and landing big punches, wearing him down until the fight was stopped in the seventh. Tyson admitted after the fight to "carrying" Biggs so as to inflict more damage, in retaliation for Biggs' pre-match comments.

Unfortunately the talented Biggs' life has been a constant fight against drug and alcohol addiction. He had to enter rehabilitation only a few months after turning professional, and some declare that his career at the time of the Tyson fight was already effectively over. Biggs' robe was sometimes emblazoned with, "Realize your potential", a drug rehabilitation mantra. An article published when he was 40 years old characterized him as "still fighting between stints in rehabilitation."

Outside the ring
Biggs competed in the American Gladiators season 5 Gold Medal Challenge of Champions in 1993, losing to 1984 Gold Downhill Skiing medalist Bill Johnson. A feature documentary about Tyrell Biggs' life is currently in production.

Professional boxing record

References

External links

1960 births
Living people
African-American boxers
Boxers from Philadelphia
Super-heavyweight boxers
Heavyweight boxers
Boxers at the 1984 Summer Olympics
Olympic boxers of the United States
Olympic gold medalists for the United States in boxing
National Golden Gloves champions
Boxers at the 1983 Pan American Games
Pan American Games bronze medalists for the United States
American male boxers
AIBA World Boxing Championships medalists
Medalists at the 1984 Summer Olympics
American Gladiators contestants
Pan American Games medalists in boxing
Medalists at the 1983 Pan American Games
21st-century African-American people
20th-century African-American sportspeople
West Philadelphia High School alumni